Prionapteryx albescens is a moth in the family Crambidae. It was described by George Hampson in 1919. It is found in Kenya.

References

Endemic moths of Kenya
Ancylolomiini
Moths described in 1919
Endemic fauna of Kenya